The Memorial to the Confederate Dead is an outdoor Confederate monument installed in Windsor, North Carolina, in the United States. It was erected in 1895 by the Confederate Veterans' Association of Bertie.

See also
 List of Confederate monuments and memorials

References

1895 establishments in North Carolina
1895 sculptures
Buildings and structures in Bertie County, North Carolina
Confederate States of America monuments and memorials in North Carolina
Outdoor sculptures in North Carolina
Statues in North Carolina